Geeling Ng (currently, Geeling Ching) is a New Zealand model, actress and restaurateur. She is best known as the title character in the English rock musician David Bowie's 1983 music video for his worldwide hit single "China Girl". She was a 23-year-old cook, in the salad section, at The Bayswater Brasserie in Sydney, with no acting experience when she auditioned for the role. Following her appearance in the video, the two had a brief affair. She has appeared in Mad Max Beyond Thunderdome (1985), Illustrious Energy (1988) and Desperate Remedies (1993).

Ng was born and raised in Auckland. She modelled for Thornton Hall and Adrienne Winkelmann before moving to Sydney in her 20s.

Ng hosts the cooking segment for TV ONE's Asia Downunder and was the operations manager at Soul Bar & Bistro in Auckland's Viaduct. She was also a contestant on Dancing with the Stars in 2008. Ng now goes by the name of Geeling Ching.

See also
 List of New Zealand television personalities

References

External links 

New Zealand actresses
New Zealand businesspeople
New Zealand television presenters
New Zealand female models
New Zealand people of Chinese descent
People from Auckland
Living people
Year of birth missing (living people)
New Zealand women television presenters